Raz Mohammed Dalili (born 1959) was the former governor of Paktia Province in Afghanistan from 2002 until 2004. His arrival as governor in the capital Gardez was delayed as local militia leader, and previous governor, Pacha Khan Zadran refused to let him into the city of Dalili eventually successfully served for two years. He is an ethnic Pashtun.

Role in the death in custody of Jamal Naseer

An 18-year-old Afghan militia soldier, named Jamal Naseer, was captured with seven other militia-men in March 2003.
Members of the Green Beret team who captured Naseer and his comrades were under investigation because it was alleged that they hid his death, colluded and falsified their reports.
CBS News reported, on September 21, 2004, that former Paktia Governor Dalili confirmed that he had requested a Green Beret officer named "Mike" to apprehend militia soldiers who were conducting illegal roadblocks, on the Khost-Gardez highway, and extorting money from travelers.  
CBS News identified Dalili as the current Governor of Wardak Province.

References

Living people
Governors of Paktia Province
Governors of Maidan Wardak Province
1959 births